Euphaedra coprates is a butterfly in the family Nymphalidae first described by Herbert Druce in 1875. It is found in the Angola and the Democratic Republic of the Congo (Kongo Central province).

The larvae feed on Phialodiscus and Allophylus species.

Similar species
Other members of the Euphaedra eleus species group q.v.

References

Butterflies described in 1875
coprates
Butterflies of Africa
Taxa named by Herbert Druce